Discoidae is a family of crustaceans belonging to the order Calanoida.

Genera:
 Disco Grice & Hulsemann, 1965
 Paradisco Gordeeva, 1975
 Pertsovius Andronov & Kosobokova, 2011
 Prodisco Gordeeva, 1975

References

Calanoida